High Hoyland is a civil parish in the metropolitan borough of Barnsley, South Yorkshire, England.  The parish contains twelve listed buildings that are recorded in the National Heritage List for England.  All the listed buildings are designated at Grade II, the lowest of the three grades, which is applied to "buildings of national importance and special interest".  The parish contains the village of High Hoyland and the surrounding countryside, and, to the north, the southernmost part of Bretton Park, to the south of the lakes.  The listed buildings in Bretton Park are a well, a grotto, and a footbridge.  The listed buildings in and around the village are a church and memorials in the churchyard, a farmhouse, and a field barn.


Buildings

References

Citations

Sources

 

Lists of listed buildings in South Yorkshire
Buildings and structures in the Metropolitan Borough of Barnsley